The Mbete (Mbere) languages are a clade of Bantu languages coded Zone B.60 in Guthrie's classification. According to Nurse & Philippson (2003), the languages form a valid node. They are :
 Mbete, Kaning'i, Mbaama–Mpini, Nduumo
Ethnologue 16 adds the Ngul (Ngoli) dialect of Dzing.

Footnotes

References